Pycnanthus is a genus of flowering plants in the nutmeg family, Myristicaceae. There are 4 species, all native to tropical Africa. Some species are lianescent, an unusual feature in this family which is otherwise composed of hardwood trees.

Species 
According to Kew's Plants of the World Online, there are four accepted species:

Pycnanthus angolensis (Welw.) Warb. - African nutmeg, ilomba
Pycnanthus dinklagei Warb.
Pycnanthus marchalianus Ghesq.
Pycnanthus microcephalus (Benth. ex Hook.f.) Warb.  (Benth ex microcephalus

References 

Myristicaceae genera